Cast Up by the Sea is a 1916 Australian film directed by John Gavin.

References

Australian silent short films
1916 films
Australian black-and-white films